The Fernand Holweck Medal and Prize is a major European prize for Physics awarded jointly every year by the British Institute of Physics (IOP) and the Société Française de Physique (SFP). It is one of the four Grand Prix of the SFP and one of the four International Bilateral Awards of the IOP, consisting of a gold medal and a 3000€ cash prize.

History 

The prize was established in 1945 as a memorial to Fernand Holweck and other French physicists who were persecuted or killed by the Nazis during the German occupation of France during World War II, from 1940 to 1945. It was originally a £150 prize. It is awarded for distinguished work in experimental physics (which reflects Holweck's scientific interest) or in theoretical physics which is closely related to experimentation. 

The Holweck Prize is awarded every year, alternately to a French physicist and a British or Irish physicist. In 1974 two awards were made to mark the centenaries of the two societies. Holweck Laureates include several Nobel Prize winners. The award received increased media attention in 2014 when it was awarded to Iranian physicist Ramin Golestanian.

Recipients 

The following have received this medal:

See also
 Institute of Physics Awards
 List of physics awards
 List of awards named after people

References

External links
 The Holweck medal and prize , Institute of Physics.

Awards established in 1945
Awards of the Institute of Physics
French science and technology awards